Ignacio Rodó (born December 11, 1986) is a Spanish filmmaker. He is best known for his short film Tuck me in (2014), which got more than 200 selections in film festivals, several awards  and millions of views on the internet.

Filmography

References

External links 
 
 

Spanish film directors
Living people
1986 births